Yape is a corregimiento in Pinogana District, Darién Province, Panama with a population of 187 as of 2010. Its population as of 1990 was 229; its population as of 2000 was 159.   It is located along the Tuira River, and not served by any paved roads.(30 April 2008). Panama: Weary repatriation, Relief Web

References

Corregimientos of Darién Province
Road-inaccessible communities of Panama